Skau is a Norwegian and Danish habitational surname from several small places or farmsteads situated in or near a forest. Notable people with the surname include:

 Annie Skau Berntsen (1911–1992), Norwegian missionary
 Bjørn Skau (1929–2013), Norwegian politician
 Marie Skau (1890–1966), Norwegian politician
 Per Skau (born 1968), former Danish darts player
 Reidar Skau (1893–1975), Norwegian judge
 Tore Skau (born 1945), Norwegian former sports shooter

See also 
 Skog (surname)

References 

Norwegian-language surnames
Toponymic surnames
Danish-language surnames